Felsinger is a surname. Notable people with the surname include:

Alane Felsinger (born 1937), Sri Lankan cricket umpire
Donald E. Felsinger, American businessman
Herbi Felsinger (1934–2018), Sri Lankan cricket umpire
Norbert Felsinger (born 1939), Austrian figure skater

See also
Fellinger